Polyscias sandwicensis, known as the 'ohe makai or Ohe kukuluāeo in Hawaiian, is a species of flowering plant in the family Araliaceae, that is endemic to Hawaii. Polyscias sandwicensis generally inhabits lowland dry forests, but is occasionally seen in coastal mesic and mixed mesic forests. It is threatened by habitat loss.

References

External links

sandwicensis
Trees of Hawaii
Endemic flora of Hawaii
Near threatened plants
Taxonomy articles created by Polbot